Ricarde Mór Burke, 9th Clanricarde or Mac William Uachtar (died 1530) was an Irish chieftain and noble.

Background
Burke was the second son of Ulick Fionn Burke, 6th Clanricarde (d.1509) and Slaine Ni Con Mara (Slany MacNamara), succeeding as chieftain in 1520 upon the death of his brother, Ulick Óge Burke, 8th Clanricarde (d.1520).

Career
In 1522 he was part of a confederation of Connacht forces that marched to Sligo to give battle to the O'Donnells, who were conquering north Connacht. However, the expedition fell apart without a fight after the failure of Conn Bacach O'Neill to defeat O'Donnell.

Family
Burke married Margaret Butler, daughter to Piers Butler, 8th Earl of Ormond (Ireland). He was succeeded by the grandson of his uncle Edmund (d.1466), John mac Richard Mór Burke, 10th Clanricarde (d.1536), who ruled till 1536.

Family tree

   Ulick Ruadh Burke, d. 1485
    |
    |
    |                      |                        |                        |                 |
    |                      |                        |                        |                 |
    Edmund, d. 1486.       Ulick Fionn          Meiler, Abbot of Tuam      John, d. 1508.   Ricard Og, d. 1519.
    |                      |                                                                   |
    |                      |___            |_
    Ricard, d. c. 1517.    |                          |              |            |            |                |
    |                      |                          |              |            |            |                |
    |                      Ulick Óge, d. 1519.   Richard Mór   Redmond   Richard Bacach    Ulick, d. 1551.  Thomas
    John, fl. 1536.                                   |                           |            |                |
                                                      |                           |            |                |
                                                 Ulick na gCeann         Roland, Bp. Clonfert. Thomas Balbh  John of Derrymaclaghtna
                                                      |                         died 1580                       |
                           ___|_                            |
                           |                    |     |               |             |                       Ricard, d. 1593.
                           |                    |     |               |             |                           |
                          Richard Sassanach   John  Thomas Feranta  Edmond   Redmond na Scuab         (Burke of Derrymaclaghtna)
                           | d. 1582.                 d. 1546.                  d. 1596.
                           |
                       Earls of Clanricarde         

 Richard an Fhorbhair de Burgh (d.1343)
 Sir William (Ulick) de Burgh (d. 1343/53), 1st Mac William Uachtar (Upper Mac William) or Clanricarde (Galway)
 Richard Óg Burke (d. 1387), 2nd Clanricarde
 Ulick an Fhiona Burke (d. 1424), 3rd Clanricarde
 Ulick Ruadh Burke (d. 1485), 5th Clanricarde
 Edmund Burke (d. 1466)
 Ricard of Roscam (d. 1517)
 John mac Richard Mór Burke (d. 1536), 10th Clanricarde
 Ulick Fionn Burke (d.1509), 6th Clanricarde
 Ulick Óge Burke (d. 1520), 8th Clanricarde
 Richard Mór Burke (d. 1530), 9th Clanricarde
 Ulick na gCeann Burke (d. 1544), 12th Clanricarde, 1st Earl of Clanricarde (1543)
 Richard Bacach Burke (d. 1538), 11th Clanricarde
 Richard Óge Burke (d. 1519), 7th Clanricarde
 Sir Uilleag Burke (d. 1551), 13th Clanricarde
 William mac Ulick Burke (d. 1430), 4th Clanricarde
 Edmund de Burgh (d. 1410)

References

Further reading
 Burke, Eamon "Burke People and Places", Dublin, 1995.
 A New History of Ireland, IX, p.172, Oxford, 1984.
 Burke (de Burgh), Ricard Mor, David Beresford, in Dictionary of Irish Biography from the Earliest Times to the Year 2002, p. 47. Cambridge, 2010.

People from County Galway
16th-century Irish people
1530 deaths
Richard Mor
Year of birth unknown